The Pa'O language (also spelled Pa-O or Pa-oh;)), sometimes called Taungthu, is a Karen language spoken by one and a half million Pa'O people in Myanmar.

The language is primarily written using a system of phonetics devised by Christian missionaries, and many of the materials now available for it on the Internet derive from Christian missionary involvement, although most of the Pa'O are generally reported to be Buddhists (without real statistics, etc.).

The language is also referred to by the exonyms "Black Karen" and "White Karen", both of which are terms used in contrast to "Red Karen" (Karenni), also of Myanmar.

Dialects include Taunggyi and Kokareit.

Phonology 
The following displays the phonological features of the Pa'O (Taungthu) language:

Consonants 

 /p, t, k, ʔ/ and /m, n, ŋ/ can occur as final consonants. Stops may also be heard as unreleased [p̚, t̚, k̚].

Vowels

References

Karenic languages